Julie Moncrieff Anthony AM OBE (born 24 August 1949) is an Australian former professional singer and entertainer. 

Anthony is well known for her brief stint as lead singer of the Seekers

A soprano, she has recorded both jazz and pop and is well-known for her live singing performances, variety appearances and roles in cabaret and theatre. Anthony has performed with numerous artists including Simon Gallagher and Anthony Warlow at the Sydney Opera House 
 
Through Anthony's extensive repertoire, she demonstrates great conviction, whether it be her rendition of "Amazing Grace" or material ranging from Stephen Sondheim to the Beatles.  
 
She recorded an album with jazz performer Don Burrows called Together at Last. 
 
She sang the Australian National Anthem at the Opening Ceremony of the 2000 Sydney Olympics with Human Nature.

Biography

Early life and career
Anthony was born to Betty and Les Lush, a sheep and wheat farmer and had an older brother. Steven. She is from a family of aunts, uncles, and grandparents who all worked in the farming sector. Les Lush played professional Australian rules football for Glenelg in the South Australian National Football League, playing 34 games and kicking 126 goals.

Anthony worked on the family farm before deciding on a singing career, citing her musical influences as Ella Fitzgerald and Burt Bacharach. She was billed originally in her career under her birth name of Julie Lush. She started performing in a local band and won a talent contest and began performing on The Country and Western Hour hosted by Reg Lindsay. She also appeared in her native Adelaide on The Ernie Sigley Show before performing regularly on The Graham Kennedy Show.

Anthony married Eddie Natt in 1976 and has two daughters, Talitha and Tamara.

With the Seekers

She sang with the Seekers, first taking the place of Judith Durham as the lead vocalist in the song "The Carnival Is Over" for the Closing Ceremony of Expo '88. Later, Anthony became a member of the group with Bruce Woodley, Athol Guy and Keith Potger. They released an album, Live On, in March 1989, which peaked at number 26.

Animation recordings
In 1991, she recorded the song "Ordinary Miracles" for the 1991 Australian animated fantasy movie The Magic Riddle. In 1992, she also recorded another song, "Sleep Bush Baby Sleep", for the Yoram Gross movie Blinky Bill The Mischievous Koala.

Theatre
Anthony starred in both the Australian and West End productions of the musical Irene in the mid-1970s. She won the Commercial Broadcasting Federation Award in Australia for Best Easy Listening Album 1975. Her first performance in the musical, at the Adelphi Theatre, London, was 15 June 1976.
 
Her numerous theatre performances include The Sound of Music, I Do! I Do! and The Mikado.
 
At midnight between 31 December 1987 and 1 January 1988, in celebration of the start of Australia's Bicentennial year, Anthony sang the Australian National Anthem, "Advance Australia Fair", on the national broadcaster, the Australian Broadcasting Corporation, which continued to show the recording of her performance at the close of broadcasting for many years afterwards, until the broadcaster introduced 24-hour broadcasting.

Commercials for St George Bank
Anthony was well-known. for her appearances for the St George Bank, in which she featured from 1974 to 1999. In 1993 she released a version of "Puff the Magic Dragon" in conjunction with the bank as part of an advertising campaign.

Discography

Studio albums

Live albums

Compilation albums

Singles

Honours and awards
Anthony is among the most awarded of Australian entertainers. She was made an Officer of the Order of the British Empire (OBE) (1980) and a Member of the Order of Australia (AM) (1989)

Australian Record Awards

|-
| 1975
| Julie Anthony Album
| Easy Listening Female Vocal
| 
|}

Mo Awards
The Australian Entertainment Mo Awards (commonly known informally as the Mo Awards), were annual Australian entertainment industry awards. They recognise achievements in live entertainment in Australia from 1975 to 2016. Julie Anthony won thirteen awards in that time.
 (wins only)
|-
| 1976
| Julie Anthony
| Best Female Vocal of the Year
| 
|-
|rowspan="2"| 1977
| Julie Anthony
| Best Female Vocal of the Year
| 
|-
| Julie Anthony
| Entertainer of the Year
| 
|-
|rowspan="2"| 1978
| Julie Anthony
| Best Female Vocal of the Year
| 
|-
| Julie Anthony
| Entertainer of the Year
| 
|-
| 1980
| Julie Anthony
| Female Vocal of the Year
| 
|-
|rowspan="2"| 1982
| Julie Anthony
| Female Vocal of the Year
| 
|-
| Julie Anthony
| Entertainer of the Year
| 
|-
| 1986
| Julie Anthony
| Female Vocal of the Year
| 
|-
|rowspan="2"| 1988
| Julie Anthony
| Female Vocal Entertainer of the Year
| 
|-
| Julie Anthony
| Daily Telegraph Readers Award - Female
| 
|-
| 1993
| Julie Anthony
| Female Vocal Variety Entertainer of the Year
| 
|-
| 1995
| Julie Anthony
| Female Vocal Variety Entertainer of the Year
| 
|-

References

External links
 

1949 births
Living people
Musicians from South Australia
Australian sopranos
Australian musical theatre actresses
Australian Officers of the Order of the British Empire
Members of the Order of Australia
20th-century Australian women singers
Blinky Bill